The death of Israa Ghrayeb took place on 22 August 2019 in the Palestinian city of Bethlehem. Israa Ghrayeb, a 21-years-old Muslim make-up artist, was reportedly beaten to death in an "honor killing" because she posted a selfie with her fiance a day before they were supposed to get engaged. Her family has denied the accusation, saying that instead she died of a heart attack.

Death and investigation
Ghrayeb died on 22 August 2019 after sustaining injuries at her home in Beit Sahour. Her death caused protests by Palestinians because of the accusation that it was an honour killing. Ghrayeb's family claims that the cause of her death was a heart attack. On September 6, Palestinian authorities had three people in custody in relation to the death and conducted a forensic investigation.

On 12 September 2019 the investigation concluded that Ghrayeb died due to complications in her respiratory system caused by repeated beatings. Three family members were charged.

Responses
The death of Israa Ghrayeb provoked outrage in the West Bank, with Palestinians arranging protests against the killing in Bethlehem and Ramallah.

The #WeAreAllIsraa hashtag was spread on social networks in solidarity with Ghrayeb.

Adalah Justice Project, a Palestinian Human Rights organisation, said they were "outraged and saddened" by the "heinous killing".

See also

Human rights in the State of Palestine

References

2019 deaths
2019 in the State of Palestine
2019 murders in Asia
21st-century controversies
August 2019 events in Asia
Conspiracy theories in Asia
Crime in the State of Palestine
Deaths in the State of Palestine
Honor killing in the State of Palestine
Honor killing victims
Palestinian women
People murdered in the State of Palestine
Violence against women in the State of Palestine